Melastrota is a monotypic moth genus in the subfamily Arctiinae erected by George Hampson in 1905. Its only species, Melastrota nigrisquamata, was described by Swinhoe in 1901. It is found in Australia, where it has been recorded from Queensland.

References

Lithosiini
Moths described in 1901
Monotypic moth genera